Monkey Swallows the Universe (MSTU) were an acoustic/indie band from Sheffield, England. Their sound has been described as "folk tinged" and "twee." MSTU were active from 2004 to 2008. They took their name from an episode of the Japanese TV series Monkey.

History
Nat Johnson and Kevin Gori established MSTU in 2003 after meeting at the University of Sheffield. In the band's first incarnation they both sang and played acoustic guitars, with Gori adding extra touches with instruments such as the recorder and glockenspiel. The band later expanded to include Catherine Tully on violin, Andy George on cello and Rob Dean on drums. Johnson became the main singer and songwriter. In February 2006, the band released its first album “The Bright Carvings”, on the small independent record label Thee Sheffield Phonographic Corporation. The band had been featured a number of times in Sandman magazine.

On 11 April 2006 the band appeared on Gideon Coe's BBC 6 Music morning radio show, and played two songs live in session. In May 2006, the band supported Richard Hawley on three dates of his UK tour. Later that year, the band supported The Long Blondes on five dates of their UK tour. In July 2006 MSTU released "Science" (b/w "Happiness & Florence") as a CD single, and on 7" vinyl (b/w "Happiness") also on Thee SPC.

The band signed to Loose Records to release a second album, The Casket Letters, in August 2007. The band also released a single from the album, "Little Polveir", a song named after a racehorse which was an unlikely winner of the British Grand National. The band performed further live radio sessions, including an appearance on Radio 4's Loose Ends. The band appeared at several festivals in the UK, including Latitude, Green Man, Truck, Secret Garden Party and End of the Road. A download-only single, "Bloodline", was released in September 2007, backed with a cover of Jonathan Richman's "Ice Cream Man". The band performed these songs live on Marc Riley's 6 Music show.

On 4 December 2007, the band announced via its official website that it would be taking an indefinite hiatus after touring. Monkey Swallows the Universe played their last show in Edinburgh on 11 February 2008. After the announcement of hiatus, Nat Johnson began a solo career and released the single "Dirty Rotten Soul" in 2008. In 2009, she and Kevin Gori formed Nat Johnson and the Figureheads, who released albums on Damaged Goods Records and Thee Sheffield Phonographic Corporation.

Nat Johnson appeared on the David Rotheray album The Life of Birds on the track "Flying Lessons" and on the album Another Sleepless Night with Rory McVicar by Rory McVicar. She released solo singles "DOG" in May 2014 and "Not Now Horse" in September 2014. Her seven-song album Neighbour of the Year came out in November 2014.

MTSU reformed for a one-off gig at Queens Social Club in Sheffield in March 2016 to mark the 10th anniversary of the release of their first album.

Discography

Tracklisting of The Bright Carvings
 Sheffield Shanty
Martin
Jimmy Down the Well
The Chicken Fat Waltz
Down
You Yesterday
Wallow
22
Fonz You!
Still
Beautiful Never
Secret Word Is Groucho (hidden track)

Tracklisting of The Casket Letters
Statutory Rights
Bloodline
Science
Matterhoney
Gravestones
Little Polveir
Elizabeth & Mary
Ballad of the Breakneck Bride
Paper, Scissors, Stone
When the Work Is Done

Critical acclaim

"Delightful indiepop" – Daily Telegraph
"Roll over Charles Darwin and tell those musical evolutionists the news – there's yet more Sheffield Monkeys beside the Arctic variety." – The Mirror

References

External links
 The band's official website
 Loose Records
 Nat Johnson's website

British indie folk groups
English folk musical groups
Musical groups from Sheffield
Musical groups established in 2003
Musical groups disestablished in 2008